Rawżat aṣ-ṣafāʾ fī sīrat al-anbiyāʾ w-al-mulūk w-al-khulafāʾ (‘The Gardens of purity in the biography of the prophets and kings and caliphs’) or Rawdatu 's-safa is a Persian-language history of the origins of Islam, early Islamic civilisation, and Persian history by Mīr-Khvānd.  The text was originally completed in seven volumes in 1497 AD; the eighth volume is a geographical index.   The work is very scholarly, Mīr-Khvānd used nineteen major Arabic histories and twenty-two major Persian ones as well as others which he occasionally quotes.  His work was the basis for many subsequent histories including the works of Hajjī Khalfah.

Style
Mīr-Khvānd made little attempt at a critical examination of historical traditions, and wrote in a flowery and often bombastic style. It comprises seven large volumes and a geographical appendix; but the seventh volume, the history of the sultan Ḥosayn, together with a short account of some later events down to 1523, cannot have been written by Mīr-Khvvānd himself, who died in 1498. He may have compiled the preface, but it was his grandson, the historian Khvānd-Amīr (1475–1534), who continued the main portion of this volume and to whom also a part of the appendix must be ascribed.

Manuscripts, editions and translations
There are various different Persian manuscripts in Iran, Vienna, Paris, and London. A Persian edition was published in Paris in 1843 as Histoire des Samanides par Mirkhond. It was published fully in Persian in 1843 (Paris) and lithographed in Mumbai (1848 or 1852). The standard edition used in scholarship is the Persian edition Tarikh i Rawzat al-Safa (7 vols) by Abbad Parviz (Tehran, 1959).

Translations
Owing to its popularity, the Rawżat aṣ-ṣafāʾ has undergone several editions and translations. Around 1596, Pedro Teixeira prepared a Spanish translation of the Rawżat aṣ-ṣafā̄ʾ. The book was partially translated into English in 1715, the Tahirid and Saffarid portions (of chapter 2.3-4) into Latin in 1782, and the Sassanid portion (of chapter 1.2) into French in 1793. A section was translated as Mirchondi Historia Seldschukidarum (1838) by Johann August Vullers.

From 1892 to 1893, a translation of the first book (up to the Rashidun caliphs) into English was prepared by the Orientalist Edward Rehatsek and edited by Forster Fitzgerald Arbuthnot for the Royal Asiatic Society, in two parts. The Vie de Mahomet d'après la tradition by E. Lamairesse and Gaston Dujarric was translated from the English (1897).

Mentions of Jesus
Mir Khvand makes mention of Jesus from the Quran. Mir Khvand records a number of miracles related to Jesus, including those mentioned in the Koran, such as Jesus speaking from the cradle, healing lepers, and raising the dead.

The text in Edward Rehatsek's translation of the Garden of Purity contains a version of the Abgar legend, regarding the conversion of King Abgar of Edessa (called Nassibin or Nasibain in the Persian text) before the crucifixion:

Ghulam Ahmad (Urdu 1899, English 1978) and later publications of the Ahmadiyya Muslim Community such as Review of Religions give a paraphrase of the Abgar story from Mir Kvand's Rawżat aṣ-ṣafā̄ʾ, also apparently placing the story of Jesus’s travels to Syria during his ministry and before the crucifixion, though later Ahmadi writers infer the events are after the crucifixion. Ahmad considered that "If the report in the Rauzat-us-Safaa is correct, it appears that, by travelling to Nasibain, Jesus intended to go to Afghanistan through Persia, and to invite to the Truth the lost tribes of Jews who had come to be known as Afghans."

Editions
English (re-print) via Zavia Books, with translation by Sheikh Syed Mubarik Ali Jilani Hashimi (2005).
English in 1832 – “no oriental work that stood higher in public estimation than this”.
Nawal Kishore Press, Lucknow, (n.d.) 
Arabic (1988) – روضة الصفا في سيرة الأنبياء والملوك والخلفاء - محمد بن خاوندشاه - الدار المصرية للكتاب؛ المحقق السباعس محمد السباعي, أحمد عبد القادر الشاذلي

Notes

Work online

See also
List of Sunni books

Islamic mythology
Islamic literature
History books about Islam
History books about Iran
1497 books
Biographies (books)
Persian-language literature
History books about India
Historiography of India
Swoon hypothesis
Jesus in Islam